The No. 25 Squadron, nicknamed Eagles, is a tactical attack squadron from the No. 34 Wing of the Pakistan Air Force's Central Air Command. It is currently deployed at Rafiqui Airbase and operates ROSE upgraded Dassault Mirage-5EF aircraft.

History 

The No. 25 Squadron was raised in January 1966 at Sargodha Airbase under the command of Wing Commander Tawab (who later rose to command the BAF) and was one of the first two PAF squadrons to be equipped with the newly inducted Shenyang F-6 fighters; the other being the No. 23 Squadron "Talons". The squadron was tasked with Fighter conversion duties after which the squadron trained a large number of pilots on the Shenyang F-6.

In 1967, the squadron took part in a large firepower demonstration in honour of the Shah of Iran while in 1968, the squadron presented an aerobatics display for the Soviet defence minister "Andrei Grechko". The squadron under the leadership of Squadron Leader Imtiaz Bhatti also won the 1968 Inter squadron armament competition.

Later in 1980, the squadron received a batch of Shenyang FT-6 trainer jets to facilitate their training program. 6 years later it was shifted to Mianwali Airbase to replace the 14 OCU which had been selected as PAF's third F-16 squadron. The No. 25 Squadron performed it's OCU duties till 1995 when it was nominated for the Dassault Mirage 5EF ROSE-IIs after which it's assets were transferred to the No. 17 and No. 23 Squadrons which were based at Samungli.

After the squadron's last F-6 had took off for Samungli Airbase, it was transferred to Minhas where it started trials for upgraded Mirage 5s under Project ROSE. Upon receiving its first batch of ROSE-II upgraded Mirages from Dassault in September 1998, it was designated as a Tactical Attack (TA) squadron and assigned the Night Strike role.

Operational History

1971 War 

After hostilities broke out in 1971, the squadron was one of three PAF units operating F-6 fighters. The No. 25 Squadron was on high alert since the Indian invasion in East Pakistan and flew several Combat Air Patrol & Close Air Support sorties throughout the war. On 4 December, Flight Lieutenant Syed Shahid Raza shot down a Hawker Hunter near Murid Airbase. On 5 December, the Officer Commanding; Wing Commander Saad A. Hatmi and his wingman Flight Lieutenant Javed Qazi each chased down an Indian Hawker Hunter and shot them down over Sakesar. All of the Indian warplanes belonged to the No. 27 Squadron IAF.

Later during the Battle of Shakargarh, the squadron flew several CAS missions against Indian forces invading the Shakargarh area of Pakistan during which an F-6 flown by Flight Lieutenant Syed Shahid Raza was lost to enemy ground fire, though he was seen ejecting, Raza was never found and declared MIA by the PAF. He was later awarded the Tamgha-i-Jurat.

Operation Bedaar 

In the 1990s, while based at Samungli Airbase, the Squadron provided vital air defence to Pakistan's nuclear assets notably from Indian and Israeli attacks. After the Chagai-II nuclear detonations, the mission was accomplished.

War on Terror 

The No. 25 Squadron while equipped with Dassault Mirage 5EF ROSE-IIs took active part in the KPK Insurgency. The Close Air Support provided by the squadron's Mirages in several Counterinsurgency operations by the Government of Pakistan in the former FATA regions played an important role in flushing out most of the terrorist groups.

Aircraft flown

Officer Commanders
Following is the list of known OCs of the No. 25 Squadron.

See also
List of Pakistan Air Force squadrons
No. 27 Squadron PAF
No. 25 Squadron RAF
VFA-25

References

Pakistan Air Force squadrons